Bent Formby is a biochemist and researcher.  He was born in Copenhagen, and came to the U.S. as a visiting professor in 1979.  He co-authored two books and several articles on endocrinology with T. S. Wiley.

Background
Formby began his career at the Sansum Medical Research Institute in the early 1980s, where he concentrated on biochemical models of insulin resistance in diabetes, and also looked at hormone receptors in cancer animal models. His work in diabetes covered receptor sites for specific insulin molecules, and in cancer research, he was involved with some of initial research in estrogen-receptor hormones, which led the way for the use of specific types of therapies such as Tamoxifen. He is considered one of the world's authorities on environmental aspects as they relate to hormone reactions.

Bibliography

Journal articles

Popular books

References

American health and wellness writers
American biochemists
Danish scientists
University of Copenhagen alumni
Year of birth missing (living people)
Living people
Danish emigrants to the United States